CPMI may refer to:

 Center for Plasma-Material Interactions
 Centre for Particle and Material Interfaces
 Century Properties Management, Inc.
 Chicago Purchasing Managers' Index
 Command Personnel Management Inspections
 Committee on Payments and Market Infrastructures
 Corporate Performance Management Information
 Corporate and Project Management Research Institute

Disambiguation pages